Mokhtar Hasni (born 19 March 1952) is a Tunisian football forward who played for Tunisia in the 1978 FIFA World Cup. He also played for Belgian club R.A.A. Louviéroise.

References

External links
FIFA profile

1952 births
Tunisian footballers
Tunisian expatriate footballers
Tunisia international footballers
Association football forwards
Expatriate footballers in Belgium
R.A.A. Louviéroise players
1978 FIFA World Cup players
Living people